The Fountain of the Pear Tree Canals is an ancient fountain discovered buried under the Plaza de Isabel II in Madrid, Spain, in 2009. The name comes from a 13th-century  pear tree that shaded the source spring at the fountain's location.

Background

The fountain was documented variously in the 15th century as Hontanillas or Fontanillas and is thought to have been one of the first Turkish baths in Madrid. Water from the canals supplied the population of Madrid through a distribution system made up of water carriers. The water was also used by the “lavadores,” or clothes washers. The discovered part was built in the 17th century and was originally  in length, occupying a small valley at the end of Arenal Street. It featured granite ashlars in a padded style.

The fountains shared the water from the spring with the royal palace until the mid 18th century. The spring water was transported to the palace via an aqueduct named the Amaniel. It continued to be used as a fountain until it was buried in 1809.

Work began on reconditioning the Ópera Metro station that served the Teatro Real and the two plazas in 2009, which led to the rediscovery of the fountain. Once the restorative work was completed in 2011 the upgraded station, now including an archeological museum, was opened to the public. The museum showcases the fountain of the canals along with other relics found at the site, such as the original parts of the Arenal Sewer, and the royal Amaniel Aqueduct. Madrid has a reputation for being built on water.

A replica of a small part of the fountains was erected in the Plaza Isabel to honour the discovery.

Gallery

References

External links

Archaeological sites in Spain
Archaeological discoveries in Spain